Events in the year 1998 in Greece.

Incumbents

Events

Deaths
 February 10 – Yorgos Vrasivanopoulos, Greek actor (b. 1924)
 August 8 – Nelly's, Greek female photographer (b. 1899)

References

 
Years of the 20th century in Greece
Greece
1990s in Greece
Greece